Sayh may refer to:

 Sayh, United Arab Emirates
Sayh, Yemen